Tom Cottringer (born December 28, 1947) is a Canadian former professional ice hockey player who played in the World Hockey Association (WHA). Cottringer played in two WHA games during the 1972–73 season with the Philadelphia Blazers.

References

External links

1947 births
Living people
Canadian ice hockey goaltenders
Sportspeople from Niagara Falls, Ontario
Philadelphia Blazers players
Ice hockey people from Ontario
Greensboro Generals (EHL) players